Video Singles Collection is a 2016 three-DVD music video compilation by Depeche Mode, containing all the videos released for singles by the band between 1981 and 2013.

Video Singles Collection is the first official Depeche Mode archival title to be released under the Sony imprimatur since SME acquired rights to the DM catalog in July 2015. The videos have been restored for this collection, and some of the videos have audio commentaries from the remaining members of Depeche Mode (Dave Gahan, Martin Gore, Andrew Fletcher).

Most videos on the DVDs are in 4:3 aspect ratio (including ten videos recorded in 16:9, which are letterboxed), but a few later videos are in anamorphic 16:9.

Track listing

References

2016 video albums
Depeche Mode video albums